Else Kollerud Furre, née Saxegaard (12 August 1922 – 5 August 2019) was a Norwegian politician for the Conservative Party.

She served as a deputy representative to the Parliament of Norway from Akershus during the term 1958–1961. In total she met during 4 days of parliamentary session. Born at Hemnes, she was the first woman in Søndre Høland municipal council. She was married three times.

References

1922 births
2019 deaths
People from Aurskog-Høland
Deputy members of the Storting
Conservative Party (Norway) politicians
Akershus politicians
Norwegian women in politics
Women members of the Storting